Lindsay Mathyssen  is a Canadian politician who was elected to represent the riding of London—Fanshawe in the House of Commons of Canada in the 2019 Canadian federal election. She is the daughter of Irene Mathyssen, whom she succeeded in office.

Electoral record

References

External links

Living people
New Democratic Party MPs
Members of the House of Commons of Canada from Ontario
Politicians from London, Ontario
Women members of the House of Commons of Canada
21st-century Canadian politicians
21st-century Canadian women politicians
Year of birth missing (living people)